Body Business is a 1986 Australian TV mini-series directed by Colin Eggleston set against the background of the world of modelling.

Premise
After nine years in New York, Patricia returns to Sydney to take control of the family company from her sister Victoria.

References

External links
 
 Body Business at AustLit

1980s Australian television miniseries
1986 Australian television series debuts
1986 Australian television series endings
1986 television films
1986 films
Films directed by Colin Eggleston
English-language television shows
1980s English-language films